Fillmore County is a county in the U.S. state of Minnesota. As of the 2020 census, the population was 21,228. Its county seat is Preston. Fillmore County is included in the Rochester metropolitan area.

History
Fillmore County was created on March 5, 1853. It is named for Millard Fillmore, the 13th president of the United States. Fillmore County was an early destination for Euro-American settlement following the United States' 1851 treaties with the Dakota nations. Norwegian immigrants were particularly numerous. In 1860 Fillmore was Minnesota's most populous county.

Geography
Fillmore County is on Minnesota's border with Iowa. The Root River drains the county, flowing eastward. The North Branch and the Middle Branch combine east of Shady Creek, while the South Branch meets their combined flow at Preston. Bear Creek drains the lower part of the county, discharging into the Root in the eastern part of the county. Willow Creek also drains a portion of the lower county, discharging into the Root at Preston. The Upper Iowa River flows eastward, mostly in adjoining Iowa counties, but briefly enters Fillmore County near the midpoint of its southern border.

The county's terrain consists of rolling hills, carved by gullies and drainages, with the available area dedicated to agriculture. The terrain slopes to the east; its highest point is on the lower western border, at 1,378' (420m) ASL.

The county is part of the Driftless Area or Paleozoic plateau. This part of Minnesota was ice-free during the last ice age. Fillmore County also displays a karst topography.

Major highways

  U.S. Highway 52
  U.S. Highway 63
  Minnesota State Highway 16
  Minnesota State Highway 30
  Minnesota State Highway 43
  Minnesota State Highway 44
  Minnesota State Highway 56
  Minnesota State Highway 74
  Minnesota State Highway 80
  Minnesota State Highway 139
  Minnesota State Highway 250
 List of county roads

Adjacent counties

 Winona County - northeast
 Houston County - east
 Winneshiek County, Iowa - southeast
 Howard County, Iowa - southwest
 Mower County - west
 Olmsted County - northwest

Protected areas

 Forestville/Mystery Cave State Park
 Mystery Cave State Park
 Pin Oak Prairie Scientific and Natural Area
 Rushford Sand Barrens Scientific and Natural Area
 Wycoff Balsam Fir Scientific and Natural Area

Demographics

2010 census
As of the 2010 census, there were 20,866 people, 8,545 households, and 5,763 families in the county. The population density was 24.2/sqmi (9.36/km2). There were 9,732 housing units at an average density of 11.3/sqmi (4.36/km2). The racial makeup of the county was 98.2% White, 0.2% Black or African American, 0.10% Native American, 0.3% Asian, 0.3% from other races, and 0.8% from two or more races. 1% of the population were Hispanic or Latino of any race.

There were 8,545 households, out of which 29.4% had children under the age of 18 living with them, 56.4% were married couples living together, 7% had a female householder with no husband present, 4% had a male householder with no wife present, and 32.60% were non-families. 28.30% of all households were made up of individuals, and 7.32% had someone living alone who was 65 years of age or older. The average household size was 2.40 and the average family size was 2.94.

The county population contained 24.3% under the age of 18, 6.5% from 18 to 24, 21.9% from 25 to 44, 28.20% from 45 to 64, and 17.10% who were 65 years of age or older. The median age was 43 years. For every 100 females there were 97.30 males. For every 100 females age 18 and over, there were 98.80 males.

In 2010, the median income for a household in the county was $45,888, and the median income for a family was $59,034. Males had a median income of $39,239 versus $33,571 for females. 2015 estimates state the per capita income for the county was $26,348. In 2015, about 7.4% of families and 11.10% of the population were below the poverty line, including 16.50% of those under age 18 and 10.9% of those age 65 or over.

2020 Census

Communities

Cities

 Canton
 Chatfield (part)
 Fountain
 Harmony
 Lanesboro
 Mabel
 Ostrander
 Peterson
 Preston (county seat)
 Rushford
 Rushford Village
 Spring Valley
 Whalan
 Wykoff

Unincorporated communities

 Bratsberg
 Carimona
 Cherry Grove
 Clear Grit
 Elliota
 Etna
 Fillmore
 Forestville
 Granger
 Greenleafton
 Hamilton
 Henrytown
 Highland
 Lenora
 Newburg
 Prosper
 York

Townships

 Amherst Township
 Arendahl Township
 Beaver Township
 Bloomfield Township
 Bristol Township
 Canton Township
 Carimona Township
 Carrolton Township
 Chatfield Township
 Fillmore Township
 Forestville Township
 Fountain Township
 Harmony Township
 Holt Township
 Jordan Township
 Newburg Township
 Norway Township
 Pilot Mound Township
 Preble Township
 Preston Township
 Spring Valley Township
 Sumner Township
 York Township

Government and politics
Fillmore County was a swing county until the 2016 presidential election. From 1980 to 2016, the county predicted the president 67% of the time. Since 2016, Fillmore County has shifted rightward and has voted for the Republican nominee by double digits.

Education
School districts include:
 Chatfield Public Schools
 Fillmore Central School District
 Kingsland Public School District
 Lanesboro Public School District
 LeRoy-Ostrander Public Schools
 Mabel-Canton Public School District
 Rushford-Peterson Public Schools
 St. Charles Public School District
 Stewartville Public School District

See also
 Commonweal Theatre Company
 Dream Acres
 National Register of Historic Places listings in Fillmore County, Minnesota

References

External links
 Fillmore County government's website
 Fillmore County Health and Demographic Data

 
Minnesota counties
Driftless Area
1853 establishments in Minnesota Territory
Populated places established in 1853